Clarence W. Gilley was a member of the Wisconsin State Assembly.

Biography
Gilley was born Clarence William Gilley on May 11, 1919, in Rhinelander, Wisconsin. During World War II, he served in the United States Army. He died in December 1982.

Political career
Gilley was a member of the Assembly from 1949 to 1954. He was a Republican.

References

People from Rhinelander, Wisconsin
Republican Party members of the Wisconsin State Assembly
Military personnel from Wisconsin
United States Army soldiers
United States Army personnel of World War II
1919 births
1982 deaths
20th-century American politicians